John Charles Demers (born September 21, 1971) is an American attorney who served as the assistant attorney general of the National Security Division. An appointee of President Donald Trump, he served under both, President Donald Trump and President Joe Biden. John Demers also served as acting United States Attorney General for a few hours following the resignation of the previous acting United States Attorney General Jeffrey Rosen at noon on January 20, 2021, until President Joe Biden signed an executive order naming Deputy Assistant Attorney General for Human Resources and Administration Monty Wilkinson as acting United States Attorney General later that day.

Prior to Demers's departure, he was the longest-serving Senate-confirmed official from the Trump administration, that was retained for the Biden administration. Demers's long-planned departure from the Justice Department garnered attention when the Trump administration data seizure became publicly known in June 2021, which happened to coincide with his departure. Though Demers asked to leave immediately, the Biden administration asked him to remain until the end of June. Demers was succeeded by Matthew Olsen. At the end of June, with Olsen not yet confirmed, Demers left the Justice Department and was replaced on an acting basis by acting acting Brooklyn U.S. Attorney Mark Lesko.

Early life and education
Demers was born in Gubbio, Italy. He is a graduate of the College of the Holy Cross and Harvard Law School.

Career 
Prior to his post in the United States Department of Justice, Demers served as the vice president and assistant general counsel at Boeing. Demers clerked for Diarmuid O'Scannlain of the United States Court of Appeals for the Ninth Circuit and Antonin Scalia of the Supreme Court of the United States. He worked in private practice before serving in the Office of Legal Counsel. Demers was on the leadership team of the United States Department of Justice National Security Division, first as senior counsel to the Assistant Attorney General and then as Deputy Assistant Attorney General for the Office of Law & Policy. Demers is an adjunct professor of national security law at Georgetown University Law Center. John Demers's appointment to the head of the United States Department of Justice National Security Division garnered praise from both Democrats and Republicans. The Senate praised his work under both Republican and Democratic administrations, which included serving in the DOJ's National Security Division's leadership team in both 2006 and 2009.

In March 2020, the Justice Department dropped the indictment against a Russian company Concord Management and Consulting. The indictment stemmed from Robert Mueller's Russia investigation. Demers and US Attorney Timothy Shea said that while "the prosecution was properly commenced in the first place", continuing to pursue the case would "risk of exposure of law enforcement's tools and techniques". Concord lawyer Eric Dubelier who sought a trial in the case said the purpose of the indictment was "to make a political statement regarding the outcome of the 2016 election that was grossly overstated".

Demers led the United States Department of Justice's China Initiative, an effort to counter Chinese espionage and intelligence activities in the U.S. This initiative was intended to enable the National Security Division to combat Chinese espionage activities, in particular, Chinese intellectual property theft, surveillance, and a myriad of classified national security threats. This is considered to be Demer's signature achievement. These initiatives were continued by the Department of Justice under Demer's nominated successor, Matthew Olsen, until its termination on 23 February 2022.

Though not directly involved, Demers was possibly briefed on the Trump administration data seizure in which the Justice Department seized by subpoenas the communications information for members of Congress, journalists, and the Trump White House counsel. He announced he was leaving the Justice Department days after the full extent of the Trump administration data seizure became publicly known, though he was reported to have been planning his departure for some time earlier.

See also 
 List of Chinese spy cases in the United States
 List of law clerks of the Supreme Court of the United States (Seat 9)
 Trump–Ukraine scandal
 United States Assistant Attorney General
 United States Department of Justice
 United States Department of Justice National Security Division
 Meng Wanzhou

References

External links 

 Biography at Boeing
 Biography at Georgetown Law
 

|-

1971 births
20th-century American lawyers
21st-century American lawyers
Biden administration cabinet members
Boeing people
College of the Holy Cross alumni
George W. Bush administration personnel
Georgetown University Law Center faculty
Harvard Law School alumni
Law clerks of the Supreme Court of the United States
Lawyers from Washington, D.C.
Living people
People from Gubbio
Trump administration personnel
United States Assistant Attorneys General
United States Department of Justice lawyers